Conservation Genetics Resources is a quarterly peer-reviewed scientific journal covering methodological improvements, computer programs, and the development of genomic resources related to conservation genetics. It was established in 2009 and is published by Springer Science+Business Media. The editor-in-chief is Benoit Goossens (Cardiff University). According to the Journal Citation Reports, the journal has a 2015 impact factor of 0.446.

See also
Conservation Genetics

References

External links

Genetics journals
English-language journals
Springer Science+Business Media academic journals
Publications established in 2009
Quarterly journals